American pop singer Britney Spears has released nine studio albums, eight compilation albums, nine box sets, three extended plays (EPs), 50 singles (including two as a featured artist), 11 promotional singles, two charity singles, and has made three guest appearances. In 1997, Spears signed a recording contract with American record label Jive Records in order to launch her career.

Spears made her chart debut in November 1998 with "...Baby One More Time", which was followed by the release of her debut studio album, ...Baby One More Time (1999). The record opened the Canadian Albums Chart and the US Billboard 200 at number one, being later certified fourteen times platinum by the Recording Industry Association of America (RIAA). The singer's second studio album, Oops!... I Did It Again, was made available for consumption on May 16, 2000, and became the fastest-selling record ever by a female act in America, bringing first-week sales of 1,319,193 units and certified diamond in United States. It spawned four singles—"Oops!... I Did It Again", "Lucky", "Stronger", and "Don't Let Me Be the Last to Know". In November 2001, the singer's third eponymous album spawned worldwide hit "I'm a Slave 4 U", which had been pointed out by music critics for being a musical departure from her previous material. Spears released her fourth studio album, In the Zone, in November 2003, which featured "Me Against the Music"—a collaboration with Madonna that reached the top position of the European Hot 100 Singles—and "Toxic", which earned Spears her first Grammy in the category of Best Dance Recording, and gained her credibility among critics. The singer's first compilation album, Greatest Hits: My Prerogative, was released the following year.

Following experiencing personal struggles through 2007, Spears's fifth studio album, Blackout, was released in October of the same year. Unlike all of the singer's previous records, Blackout failed to be heavily promoted through magazine interviews, talk-show appearances, or televised performances—besides a performance at the 2007 MTV Video Music Awards—and was not accompanied by a supporting tour either. With the release of her sixth studio album Circus, Spears became the only act in the Nielsen SoundScan era—from 1991 to present,—to have four records debuting with 500,000 or more copies sold in the United States. Supported by the releases of commercially successful international hits like "Womanizer" and "Circus", it managed to sale four million copies globally. The singer's third compilation album, The Singles Collection, featured her third number one single in America, "3". In 2011, she released the song "Hold It Against Me", which made Spears the second artist in the Billboard Hot 100's 52-year history to debut at number one with two or more songs, just behind American recording artist Mariah Carey. The track was included on her seventh studio album, Femme Fatale, which debuted at number one in that country. Also her first album ever to yield three top ten hits in the US, including commercially successful singles like "Till the World Ends" and "I Wanna Go". Spears's eighth studio album, Britney Jean, was released in 2013. It marks Spears's first major activity under RCA Records since the dissolution of her long-time record label, Jive Records, in 2011. Receiving mixed reviews from music critics, it experienced minor commercial success, and thus became the lowest-selling record of her career. Spears began working on her ninth studio album in 2014; she also renewed her record deal with RCA Records. Glory was released in 2016 and received positive reviews from music critics. The album debuted at number three on US Billboard 200 with 111,000 album-equivalent units, including 88,000 copies sold, and spawned the singles "Make Me" and "Slumber Party", which peaked at 17 and 86 on the Hot 100, and topped the Dance Club Songs in the United States.

Spears has sold over 100 million records worldwide, including 70 million records in United States (36.9 million digital singles and 33.6 million digital albums), making her one of the best-selling music artists of all time. Billboard ranked her the eighth overall Artist of the Decade, and also recognized her as the best-selling female album artist of the 21st century's first decade, as well as the fifth overall. Additionally, the Recording Industry Association of America recognized Spears as the eighth best-selling female artist in the United States, with 34.5 million certified albums. Spears serves as one of the few artists in history to have a number-one single and studio album in each of the three decades of their career—1990s, 2000s, and 2010s. As of 2019, Spears has reportedly drawn 25 billion in cumulative radio airplay audience and 2.6 billion on-demand U.S. audio and video streams combined.

Albums

Studio albums

Compilation albums

Box sets

Extended plays

Singles

1990s

2000s

2010s

2020s

Promotional singles

Charity singles

Other charted songs

See also
 List of songs recorded by Britney Spears
 List of unreleased songs recorded by Britney Spears
 Britney Spears videography

Notes

References

Bibliography
 

Discography
Pop music discographies
Discographies of American artists